Betta simorum is a species of gourami endemic to Indonesia.  This species grows to a length of  SL.  This species can also be found in the aquarium trade. The species was named simorum and uses the Latin genitive plural "of the Sims", named so in honour of Thomas G. K. Sim and his wife Farrah, of Sindo Aquarium in Jambi, Sumatra.

References

simorum
Fish described in 1996